The Tunnel of Mauvages is a river tunnel on the Marne–Rhine Canal. It is 4,877 meters long and was built from 1841 to 1846 near the city of Mauvages, Meuse department. The tunnel is equipped with a bipolar 600 volt overhead wire for electric vessels .

References 

Bodies of water of France